The Universiade Pavilion, better known as the Butterdome, is a 5,500-seat multi-purpose arena in Edmonton, Alberta, Canada, on the campus of the University of Alberta. It was built for the 1983 Summer Universiade.

While the official name of the facility is the Universiade Pavilion, because of its rectangular shape and bright yellow exterior, locals quickly began referring to it as the Butterdome. Today, even the University of Alberta often uses this nickname to refer to this structure.

The upper sections of the regular seating are permanently mounted, while the lower sections are collapsible to increase the space available on the floor. During the University Games, the capacity was increased to 11,000 using temporary bleachers.

Facilities at the Pavilion include:
6-lane rubberized 200m indoor track (10-lane 60m sprint straightaway)
4 basketball/volleyball/tennis courts
4 badminton courts
Long jump and pole vault
Wrestling room
The facility also hosts indoor soccer, flatball, and field hockey games.

Notes

External links
360° Virtual Tour
University of Alberta Athletics
Edmonton Energy

Basketball venues in Canada
Sports venues in Edmonton
Athletics (track and field) venues in Canada
University of Alberta buildings
University sports venues in Canada
Indoor track and field venues
Taekwondo venues
1983 establishments in Alberta
Sports venues completed in 1983
Music venues in Edmonton
University and college buildings completed in 1983